Drum major may refer to:
Drum major (marching band), leader of a civilian marching band, drum and bugle corps, or pipe band
Drum major (military), leader of a military band, pipes and drums, or corps of drums

See also
 Drum major general, former royal appointment in the British Army
 Drum Major Institute, American progressive think tank